The men's discus throw event at the 2011 World Championships in Athletics was held at the Daegu Stadium on August 29 and 30.

Defending champion Robert Harting was a clear winner, with three throws better than silver medalist Gerd Kanter.

Medalists

Records

Qualification standards

Schedule

Results

Qualification
Qualification: Qualifying Performance 65.50 (Q) or at least 12 best performers (q) advance to the final.

Final

References

External links
Discus throw results at IAAF website

Discus throw
Discus throw at the World Athletics Championships